Antwaun Stanley is an American R&B singer and songwriter based in Ann Arbor, Michigan.

Career

Stanley grew up in Flint, Michigan. He began singing at age three and took part in talent competitions including The Queen Latifah Show and Showtime at the Apollo. He attended high school at Flint Central High School and graduated in 2005. He signed with Bajada records, an independent record label, and studied at the University of Michigan. In college he released an album titled I Can Do Anything. The album reached number 22 on the U.S. Gospel Albums chart. The album's third track, "Teach Me", reached number 29 on the U.S. Gospel Songs chart. In 2008 he was nominated for Stellar Awards in the category New Artist of the Year. In college he performed with funk band Groove Spoon and a cappella group Dicks and Janes. Stanley is a frequent collaborator and vocalist with the jazz group Vulfpeck, which is also comprised largely of University of Michigan alums. He performs with Ann Street Soul and with Video 7, a genre-free musical collective. In 2015 he opened for hip-hop artist Common. In June 2021, Stanley announced the collaborative EP Ascension with musician and producer Tyler Duncan.

Discography
Studio albums
 I Can Do Anything (2006)

With Ann Street Soul
 Ann Street Soul EP (2013)
 "Getaway" (2015)
 "Sunny" (2015)

With Vulfpeck
 "Wait for the Moment" (2013)
 "1612" (2014)
 "Funky Duck" (2015)
 "1 for 1, DiMaggio" (2016)
 "Aunt Leslie" (2016)
 "Birds of a Feather, We Rock Together" (2017)
 "Grandma" (2017)
 "Business Casual" (2017)
 "Darwin Derby" (2018)

 "3 on E" (2020)
 "New Guru" (2022)
 "Simple Step" (2022)
 "In Heaven" (2022)
 "Serve Somebody" (2022)
 "What Did You Mean By Love?" (2022)

With Groove Spoon 
 Live From the Dude (11.8.09) EP (2010) 
 "You're Time" (2010)

With Cory Wong
 "Work It Out" (2017)
 "Pleasin'" (2017)
 "Jumbotron Hype Song" (2018)
 "United" (2021)

With Tyler Duncan

 "Ascension" (2021)
 "Lost in Translation" (2021)

References

American contemporary R&B singers
American soul singers
American gospel singers
American funk singers
African-American male singer-songwriters
Musicians from Flint, Michigan
University of Michigan alumni
Living people
Year of birth missing (living people)
Singer-songwriters from Michigan
21st-century African-American male singers